The Mountain Enterprise is a weekly newspaper published since 1966, circulating in the Mountain Communities of the Tejon Pass east and west of the Grapevine section of the Interstate 5 in the San Emigdio Mountains region of California, midway between Los Angeles and Bakersfield.  Its sister publication is The New Mountain Pioneer, published monthly.

Coverage area
The newspaper's 600-square-mile coverage area spans northern Los Angeles County, eastern Ventura County, and southwestern Kern County, including the developments of the 270,000 acre Tejon Ranch property, the Western Antelope Valley, Gorman, Lebec, Frazier Park, Lake of the Woods, Lockwood Valley, Cuddy Valley and the Pine Mountain Club community.

Ownership
The first edition of The Mountain Enterprise was issued on September 22, 1966, by Nedra Hawley Cooper as a mimeographed, hand-stapled and hand-drawn publication; its first editions were produced on a blue Royal typewriter now housed at the Ridge Route Communities Museum & Historical Society. Fred Kiesner was editor from 1973 to 1976.

Keith Nelson, superintendent of Ridgelite Products, and Kitty Jo Nelson, a teacher, purchased the business from Neil Keyzers in 1985. The Nelsons sold it to Bob Weisburg and Morrie Prizer in 1995.

In late 2004 the management of Hometown Publishing, LLC and its publications The Mountain Enterprise and The New Mountain Pioneer plus the Mountain Communities Phone Book was assumed by Gary Meyer (publisher) and Patric Hedlund (editor). In November 2006 ownership of Hometown was taken over by Meyer, Hedlund and Pam Sturdevant, with general management continuing under Meyer and Hedlund. In 2014 ownership passed to Meyer and Hedlund, who remain its managers. It is today published in a tabloid format of between 28 and 36 pages weekly.

Awards

2017

The  National Newspaper Association  (NNA) announced The Mountain Enterprise was awarded First Place for Best Breaking News Series for "SWAT Standoff Alarms Mountain," by Patric Hedlund.

2015

The Mountain Enterprise was awarded First Place by the National Newspaper Association for Best Feature Photo by Jeff Zimmerman.

2014

First Place for Best Editorial Comment was awarded for Patric Hedlund's "Brought to you compliments of AB109: Convicted burglar returns to the mountain."

2013

The Mountain Enterprise was awarded Artistic Photo Second Place from the California Newspaper Publishers Association for Patric Hedlund's image of a colorful benefit run for Mountain Youth Can Change Communities (MyC3). That same year Gary Meyer and Patric Hedlund won Editorial Comment Second Place for "Lebec County Water District needs serious leadership." The newspaper also won Second Place for Front Page design that included a towering smoke plume over Interstate 5 by Aaron Rose, and a fourth Second Place for Website excellence.

2011

In April 2011, The Mountain Enterprise won the California Newspaper Publishers Association (CNPA) 2010 First Place award for Best Website and First Place for Online Breaking News Coverage.

 2010

In April 2010, The Mountain Enterprise won the California Newspaper Publishers Association First Place award for Best Website and First Place in Public Service for its 2009 ongoing coverage of the remote Pine Mountain Club community's struggle to obtain life-saving firefighter-paramedic service.

 2009
The newspaper won awards from the National Newspaper Association on July 10 for (1) a series of investigative reports on the starvation of horses in Lockwood Valley (second place), (2) reporting on the struggle by Pine Mountain Club residents to secure Kern County's first firefighter-paramedic program (third place), (3) Editorial Writing about the newspaper's public-service responsibility in "The Stinkin' Public and Our School District's Brain Drain," by Patric Hedlund (Honorable Mention), and (4) an environmental story headed "Secret Negotiation between Tejon Developers and 'Big Green' Groups Sprouts Deal" (third place).

 2007

On July 14, the newspaper was given three awards for excellence by the California Newspaper Publishers Association.

They won First Place in the Environmental Reporting category for achievement in continuous reporting of the Fallingstar home development proposed for 700 homes around Frazier Mountain High School by Patric Hedlund, Gary Meyer, members of the community and The Mountain Enterprise team.

The newspaper also won First Place for Best Website.

The Mountain Enterprise also won Second Place in the Public Service category for achievement in continuous reporting of the Pine Mountain community's decade-long initiative to get Kern County to provide life-saving firefighter paramedic services through the Kern County Fire Department.

Controversies

2011
Lebec County Water District board member Julie McWhorter demanded that The Mountain Enterprise reporters cease using flash photography during the district's public meetings. When the newspaper refused to stop taking flash photographs, McWhorter claimed that the flashes were causing her medical problems. She also claimed that California Government Code Section 54953.5 and 54953.6 gave her the right to stop the use of illuminated photography during LCWD's public meetings. The newspaper refused to cease its photography in the face of threats by McWhorter and board member Tony Venegas to "call the sheriff." Kern County Sheriff's Sergeant Mark Brown attended an LCWD meeting in June 2013 and stated afterward that he believed the photography was appropriate for a public meeting. McWhorter chose not to run in the next election and Venegas ceased his threats against the newspaper.

2010
In December the newspaper was the target of criticism by the Kern County Grand Jury for its coverage of a controversy regarding the destruction of heritage oak trees during the construction of a new Frazier Park county library. A jury committee said a "lack of communication" was responsible for the controversy and blamed that circumstance on "the people of the area and their newspaper," adding that The Enterprise news articles "appear to be inaccurate and/or inadequately researched."
The Mountain Enterprise responded citing three statements made in the jury's report that The Enterprise says were false, and stating that the county's own arborist had told The Mountain Enterprise that the Grand Jury had not contacted him to corroborate the three claims made in the report. In an editorial, Meyer and Hedlund wrote that the jury made no attempt to contact them before issuing the report, which, they said, "attacks the citizens and the newspaper . . . with statements that are shocking in their shallowness.

2006
Pine Mountain resident David Seidner filed a lawsuit against The Mountain Enterprise for defamation,  citing stories published in the newspaper during the 2005 campaign for the Pine Mountain Club Property Owners Association Board of Directors. Seidner's preferred candidates lost the election and he claimed that The Mountain Enterprise had made untrue statements about him in the course of its reporting about the campaign issues. Seidner also had claimed that the publisher and the editor of the newspaper (Gary Meyer and Patric Hedlund) had tampered with the ballot box in the election. The Mountain Enterprise filed an Anti-SLAPP motion to strike with the court which required Seidner to demonstrate that his arguments had merit or risk paying the newspaper's attorney's fees. The suit was dropped immediately.

See also
 Kim Noller, former editor

References

External links
  Company website
 A look back at The Mountain Enterprise in 1985

Weekly newspapers published in California
Mass media in Kern County, California
Mass media in Ventura County, California
Mountain Communities of the Tejon Pass
Newspapers published in Greater Los Angeles
Publications established in 1966
1966 establishments in California